Cecil Thomas Hoekstra (April 2, 1935 – January 14, 2018) was a Canadian ice hockey left winger. He played four games in the National Hockey League with the Montreal Canadiens during the 1959–60 season. The rest of his career, which lasted from 1955 to 1972, was spent in various minor leagues.

Career 
In the AHL, Hoekstra was a member of the Rochester Americans. He played in four NHL games for the Montreal Canadiens. After retiring from professional hockey, he became the superintendent of the Cherry Hill Club in Fort Erie, Ontario, and remained with the team for over thirty years until his retirement in 2007. He died in 2018, aged 82.

Personal life 
Hoekstra's brother, Ed Hoekstra, played for the Philadelphia Flyers.

Career statistics

Regular season and playoffs

Awards and achievements
Turnbull Cup MJHL Championships (1953 & 1954)
Memorial Cup Championship (1954)
WHL Championship (1956)
Edinburgh Trophy Championship (1956)
Allan Cup Championship (1971)
Calder Cup (AHL) Championship (1964)
Honoured Member of the Manitoba Hockey Hall of Fame

References

External links
 

1935 births
2018 deaths
Buffalo Bisons (AHL) players
Calgary Stampeders (WHL) players
Canadian ice hockey left wingers
Canadian people of Dutch descent
Cleveland Barons (1937–1973) players
Montreal Canadiens players
Montreal Royals (QSHL) players
Ice hockey people from Winnipeg
Ontario Hockey Association Senior A League (1890–1979) players
Pittsburgh Hornets players
Rochester Americans players
St. Boniface Canadiens players
St. Catharines Teepees players
Winnipeg Warriors (minor pro) players